Colorado Acres is a census-designated place in Webb County, Texas, United States. The population was 296 at the 2010 census. This was a new CDP formed from parts of the Ranchitos Las Lomas CDP prior to the 2010 census.

It is one of several colonias in the county.

Geography
Colorado Acres is located at  (27.644901, -99.214301) along U.S. Highway 59 in east-central Webb County.

Education
Residents are in the United Independent School District. Zoned schools include: Dr. Henry Cuellar Elementary School, Antonio Gonzalez Middle School, and United South High School.

The designated community college for Webb County is Laredo Community College.

References

Census-designated places in Webb County, Texas
Census-designated places in Texas